Kenneth Ernest Monteith (26 June 1938 – 3 February 2023) was a Canadian politician who was a member of the House of Commons from 1988 to 1993. His background was in agriculture.

Monteith was born in St. Thomas, Ontario in 1938. He was elected in the 1988 federal election at the Elgin electoral district for the Progressive Conservative party. He served in the 34th Canadian Parliament but lost to Gar Knutson of the Liberal Party in the 1993 federal election when it was renamed Elgin—Norfolk.

Prior to being an MP, Monteith served in municipal roles:

 Deputy Reeve of Southwold Township, Ontario – 1978–1980  
 Township Councillor of Southwold Township, Ontario – 1978–1980
 Reeve of Southwold Township, Ontario – 1980

Monteith died in St. Thomas on 3 February 2023, at the age of 84.

References

External links
 

1938 births
2023 deaths
Members of the House of Commons of Canada from Ontario
People from St. Thomas, Ontario
Progressive Conservative Party of Canada MPs